The Monts Groulx (Groulx Mountains) are a range of tall hills in the geographic centre of Quebec, Canada, just east of the Manicouagan Reservoir.

References

Mountain ranges of Quebec
Landforms of Côte-Nord